John Donald Crump (March 30, 1933 – May 5, 2011) was the seventh commissioner of the Canadian Football League from January 1990 to December 1991. During the previous two decades he had worked for Harold Ballard as an executive of the Hamilton Tiger-Cats and financial officer of Maple Leaf Gardens.

Crump was born in Toronto and played football, hockey and basketball as a kid. He began his career as a chartered accountant in 1958 with a government position at the National Revenue Department.

Crump joined Maple Leaf Gardens in the 1970s and was named the commissioner in CFL history in January 1990, replacing President and Chief Executive Officer, Bill Baker.

Crump died in 2011 at age 78 at the Southlake Regional Health Centre in Newmarket, Ontario.

References

http://www.torontosun.com/2011/05/06/excfl-commish-gardens-exec-donald--crump-dies
http://www.thestar.com/sports/football/cfl/article/987198--former-cfl-commissioner-donald-crump-dies-at-age-78?bn=1

1933 births
2011 deaths
Canadian Football League commissioners
People from Toronto